Vito D'Amato (born July 27, 1944 in Gallipoli) is a retired Italian professional football player.

Honours
 Coppa Italia winner: 1968–69

1944 births
Living people
Italian footballers
Serie A players
S.S. Lazio players
Inter Milan players
A.S. Roma players
A.C. Cesena players
Hellas Verona F.C. players
Catania S.S.D. players
A.S.D. Gallipoli Football 1909 players
Association football forwards